Rodriguezia venusta is a species of orchid native to Guyana, Suriname, Venezuela, Ecuador, and Brazil.

Description
Rodriguezia venusta is an epiphytic orchid species, with sympodial growth and exuberant flowering. Its flowers bloom in the form of hanging stems full of small white flowers with a center varying between beige or yellowish tones. Its size is small, not reaching more than 20 centimeters in height, however, it is grouped in dense clumps, growing horizontally. 

Its roots are aerial, so this orchid prefers stony substrates, and planting in confined pots should be avoided.

References

External links 
Santa Barbara Orchid Estate
Botanica Ltd.

venusta
Orchids of South America
Plants described in 1837